DASL may mean:

 Datapoint's Advanced Systems Language
 Distributed Application Specification Language, developed by Sun Microsystems
 DAV Searching and Locating, a WebDAV project
 Director of American Sign Language